Banana, Coconut, and Twinkie are pejorative terms, primarily used for Asian Americans who are perceived to have been assimilated and acculturated into mainstream American culture and who do not conform to typical South Asian or East Asian cultures.

Banana and Twinkie refer to a person being perceived as 'yellow on the outside, white on the inside', and is mainly applied to people from East Asia or Vietnam, while Coconut is used to refer to darker-skinned Asians, such as those from South Asia or the Philippines. Any of these terms may be used by Asians and Asian Americans, as well as nonAsian Americans, to disparage Asians or Asian Americans for a lack of perceived authenticity or conformity, and by nonAsian Americans to praise their assimilation into mainstream white, Anglo, Christian European-American culture.

See also
American-Born Confused Desi
Boba liberal
Internalized racism
Jook-sing

Twink (gay slang)

References

Further reading
 
 

Anti-Asian slurs
Asian-American issues
English words